Waniss Taïbi (born 7 March 2002) is a French professional footballer who plays as a midfielder for Ligue 1 club Angers.

Club career 
Waniss Taïbi made his debut for Angers on 7 March 2021, coming on as a substitute in a 5–0 Coupe de France win against Club Franciscain.

He made his Ligue 1 debut on 17 April, replacing Antonin Bobichon in the 66th minute in a 3–0 home defeat against Stade Rennais.

International career 
Born in France, Taïbi is of Algerian descent. He is a youth international for France, having made three appearances and delivered two assists at the 2019 FIFA U-17 World Cup, a tournament in which France finished third.

In 2021, he was selected by Bernard Diomède for a training session with France under-19.

Honours 
France U17
 FIFA U-17 World Cup third place: 2019

References

External links
 
 

2002 births
Living people
Sportspeople from Limoges
French footballers
France youth international footballers
Association football midfielders
Angers SCO players
Championnat National 2 players
Ligue 1 players
French sportspeople of Algerian descent
Footballers from Nouvelle-Aquitaine